Qeshlaq-e Safar Ali Ghib Ali (also Romanized as Qeshlāq-e Şafar ʿAlī Ghīb ʿAlī) is a village in Qeshlaq-e Sharqi Rural District, Qeshlaq Dasht District, Bileh Savar County, Ardabil Province, Iran. At the 2006 census, its population was 55, in 10 families.

References 

Populated places in Bileh Savar County
Towns and villages in Bileh Savar County